Diamond Lake Township may refer to the following townships in the United States:

 Diamond Lake Township, Dickinson County, Iowa
 Diamond Lake Township, Lincoln County, Minnesota